Nicholas Howe is a British lightweight rower. He competed internationally between 1979 and 1990, and was twice world champion – with the lightweight men's four in 1979 and then the lightweight men's eight in 1980.

References

Living people
World Rowing Championships medalists for Great Britain
British male rowers
Year of birth missing (living people)